Christian Wulff (born 1959) is a German politician and lawyer.

Christian Wulff may also refer to:
 Christian Wulff (1777–1843), Danish naval officer
 Christian Wulff (1810–1856), Danish naval officer
 Christian Wulff (born 1959), German politician and lawyer

See also
 Christian Wolff (disambiguation)